Elbert Grant "Babe" Melton was an American Negro league baseball center fielder and second baseman. He played from 1926 to 1929 with the Cleveland Elites, Cleveland Tigers, Lincoln Giants, and Baltimore Black Sox.

References

Further reading
 "Southern Enterprises: Killed by Falling Tree". The Charlotte Observer. February 14, 1913. p. 4
 "Doings in Spencer: Killed by Falling Tree". Salisbury Evening Post. February 15, 1913. p. 7
 "Buffalo Cubs Set". The Pittsburgh Courier. May 25, 1929. p. 17
 "Cuban Giants to Play Sumter". The Sumter Item. April 14, 1930. p. 1
 "Important Hub Twi League Game Tonight". The Boston Globe. July 28, 1931. p. 19
 "North Cambridge Trips". The Boston Globe. July 30, 1931. p. 22
 "Win Gives Giants Lead in Twi Loop". The Boston Globe. August 5, 1931. p. 21
 "Roslindale Hands Giants a Beating". The Boston Globe. September 2, 1931. p. 13
 "Advance Guard of Sox Here". Baltimore Afro-American. May 20, 1933. p. 17

External links
 and Seamheads

Cleveland Elites players
Cleveland Tigers (baseball) players
Lincoln Giants players
Baltimore Black Sox players
Baseball players from North Carolina
People from Rowan County, North Carolina
1898 births
Year of death unknown
Baseball outfielders